The Shoe Shop–Doucette Ten Footer is a historic wooden building at 36 William Street in Stoneham, Massachusetts, in the United States. On April, 1984, it was listed in the National Register of Historic Places.  The building sits at the back of the Stoneham Historical Society premises.

A ten footer was a small backyard shop structure built in the 18th and 19th centuries in New England to serve as a shoemaker's shop. The ten footers were forerunners of the large shoe factories that developed in New England later in the 19th century.

See also
National Register of Historic Places listings in Stoneham, Massachusetts
National Register of Historic Places listings in Middlesex County, Massachusetts

References

Sources
 Hunter, Ethel A., The Ten-Footers of New England in Parks, Roger, editor, The New England Galaxy: The best of 20 years from Old Sturbridge Village, Chester Connecticut: Globe Pequot Press, 1980, pp. 134–139, 

Commercial buildings on the National Register of Historic Places in Massachusetts
Buildings and structures in Stoneham, Massachusetts
Shoemaking
Retail buildings in Massachusetts
National Register of Historic Places in Stoneham, Massachusetts